On the Road Again is the third solo album by Roy Wood. The album was released only due to the intervention of Warner Bros. boss Mo Ostin, but it was only released in the United States, Germany and the Netherlands. The album includes guest appearances from Carl Wayne, Andy Fairweather-Low and John Bonham.

Two singles were released from the album: The title track (with Wizzard's "Saxmaniacs", an instrumental from the then-unreleased album Main Street, on the b-side) and "Keep Your Hands on the Wheel" (with Wizzo Band's "Giant Footsteps", from their only album Super Active Wizzo, on the B-side). "Dancing at the Rainbow's End" was also released as a single, but credited to Wizzo Band.

Track listing
"(We're) On the Road Again" – 4:22
"Wings over the Sea" – 3:11
"Keep Your Hands on the Wheel (Said Marie to the Driver)" – 4:16
"Colourful Lady" – 5:06
"Road Rocket" – 3:27
"Backtown Sinner" – 4:12
"Jimmy Lad" – 4:28
"Dancin' at the Rainbow's End" – 3:35
"Another Night" – 3:23
"Way Beyond the Rain" – 5:33

References

1979 albums
Albums produced by Roy Wood
Warner Records albums
Albums recorded at Rockfield Studios